Cadle may refer to:

People
Notable people with this surname (and occasional given name) include:
 Andrew Cadle (1864–1938), South African cricketer
 Brian Cadle (1948–2015), Canadian ice hockey player
 George Cadle (1948–2015), American golfer
 Giles Cadle, British set designer
 E. Howard Cadle (1884–1942), American evangelist  
 Kevin Cadle (1955–2017), British-based American sports presenter
 Richard Fish Cadle (1796–1857), American Episcopalian priest
 Scott Cadle (in office 2012–2016/2018–2020), American politician
 George Cadle Price (1919–2011), Belizean statesman

Places
 Cadle, Alabama, a ghost town
 Cadle, Swansea, Wales, a suburban area near Fforestfach
 Cadle Monolith, a rock monolith in Antarctica

Other
 Cadle Mission, an Episcopal boarding school in Wisconsin
 Cadle Tabernacle, a former church in Indianapolis

See also
 Cadley (disambiguation)
 Candle (disambiguation)